The 1920 Norwegian Football Cup was the 19th season of the Norwegian annual knockout football tournament. The tournament was open for all members of NFF. Ørn won their first title, having beaten Frigg in the final. This was second consecutive year that Frigg lost the final.

First round

|}

Second round

|}

Third round

|colspan="3" style="background-color:#97DEFF"|19 September 1920

|}

Quarter-finals

|colspan="3" style="background-color:#97DEFF"|3 October 1920

|}

Semi-finals

|colspan="3" style="background-color:#97DEFF"|10 October 1920

|}

Final

See also
1920 in Norwegian football

References

Norwegian Football Cup seasons
Norway
Football Cup